Phleng phuea chiwit (IPA:; lit. "songs for life") describes a type of Thai folk music, strongly influenced by elements of Western folk and rock music with a protest theme mainly centred on the hardship of working-class people and in favor of a democratic political system. The term phleng phuea chiwit (songs for life) came from "art for life" or "literature for life", that is, literature on life and society, while phleng phuea chiwit era flourishing in the 1970s also known as "jewel of the literature of life".<ref>[http://clip.thaipbs.or.th/file-8737 Anniversary 40 years, 1973 Thai popular uprising"]  Thai PBS, 25 October 2013.</ref>

History

The philosophical roots of phleng pheua chiwit was in the Art for Life movement led by Marxist thinker Chit Phumisak in 1957.

Phleng Phuea Chiwit originated from the events of 14 October 1973, when student and popular protests drove off the "three tyrants." The earliest phleng phuea chiwit band was called Caravan, which was formed after the 1973 student massacre. In 1976, police and right wing activists attacked students at Thammasat University. Caravan, along with other bands and activists, fled for the hills. There, Caravan continued playing music for local farmers. Caravan released their albums Khon Kap Khwai (Man and Buffalo, 1975) and Amerikan Antarai (Dangerous American, 1976), inspired by American protest songs.

In the 1980s, phleng phuea chiwit combined Western folk music with an increasing admixture from rock music, Latin rock, and country. Phleng phuea chiwit bands and artists such as Hammer, Pongsit Kamphee, Pongthep Kradonchamnan gained in popularity. Carabao, achieved success when their fifth album, Made in Thailand'', became a hit in 1984 and sold over four million copies. Many artists of the 1990s including Indochine, Kon Darn Kwean, Maleehuana, Hope Family, Noo-Miter, Jaran Manopetch, Katorn, Zu Zu, and Su Boonleang were influenced by other genres such as luk thung and reggae. Rock artists influenced by phleng phuea chiwit include Palaphol Pholkongseng, Thanapol "Suea" Intharit, and Sib Lor (led by Hugo).

Styles
Phleng phuea chiwit typically incorporates elements of Western as well as Thai folk ballads, more rhythmic Thai styles such as samcha, mor lam, and luk thung, and occasionally elements of Thai classical music as well. More recently, elements of reggae, ska and Latin music have found their way into the genre as well. As for the instrumentation, early phleng phuea chiwit was generally in a more folk style, with acoustic instruments, while later versions often more rock-style arrangements, with electric guitars, bass, and drums. Many artists also use Thai instruments such as the phin, wut, khluay, and saw. Some phleng phuea chiwit artists were inspired by Western musicians including Bob Dylan, Bob Marley, Simon & Garfunkel, and Neil Young.

Phleng phuea chiwit artists

 Kamron Samboonnanon
 Caravan
 Surachai Janthimathorn
 Phongthep Kradonchamnan
 Zu Zu
 Raphin Phutthichart
 Hammer
 Jaran Manopetch
 Tom Dandee
 Maleehuana
 Carabao
 Yuenyong Opakul
 Preecha Chanapai
 Thierry Mekwattana
 Amnaat Luukjan
 Thanis Sriklindee
 Pongsit Kamphee
 Thanapol Intharit

References

External links
Forlifethailand.com 

Thai styles of music
1970s in music
Political music genres
Democracy promotion
Student protests